Saubhagyasagar is a Digambara monk.

Biography
Saubhagyasagar was promoted as Acharya in Karol Bagh, Delhi in November 2014. He visited Etawah, Uttar Pradesh in April 2016 and laid the foundation stone for "Mahamrityunjay Tirtha Kshetra".

References

Jain acharyas
Indian Jain monks 
21st-century Indian Jains 
21st-century Jain monks 
21st-century Indian monks